Radio Disney Brasil is a radio network that is mostly owned by Rádio Holding, but The Walt Disney Company also has a 30% share. São Paulo is the only city in Brazil that has this format being carried on a radio station. The station broadcasts on 91.3 MHz and online. All programming is produced and broadcast live from World Trade Center de São Paulo (in short WTCSP), whilst the transmitter is located at the top of São Luís Gonzaga building in Espigão da Paulista.

The music programming is aimed primarily at youth and adolescents, similar to the American version, and it's the ninth one of its kind in Latin America.

History

Change in 91.3 FM frequency 
In the second quarter of 2009, FM Nossa Radio stopped transmitting on 91.3 to move to 106.9 MHz. With that change, rumours began about the future of this frequency in São Paulo. Shortly before the end of the year, the station began carrying adult-oriented music and there was news that there was a possibility that the Disney Group would acquire a station in the city. The conglomerate has a minority stake in the radio in partnership with the Brazilian company Radio Holding LTDA. With this acquisition, this became the largest investment of a foreign group in Brazil at the time.

Project starters 
In the first half of 2010, after obtaining the concession by the Disney Group, the 91.3 frequency (with no official name until this time yet) started playing (mysteriously) uninterrupted youth-based (mostly pop) music, playing songs by artists like Demi Lovato, Jonas Blue, Miley Cyrus, among various others. The project was based on a broader sense of a format aimed at young audiences, bringing more interactivity through listener participation through social networks, SMS and telephone. In 2012, the station announced a relaunch of its broadcast studios to offer a better sound quality in frequency 91.3.

Promotion for the new station 
In October 2010, a new campaign began, "91.3 Que radio es esa?" ("91.3 What radio [station] is that?"), causing much excitement for São Paulo radio listeners, whether they had listened to the station prior to this point or not. Monica Leon, Telma Emerick, Roberto Hais, Serginho Bralle, and Marcelo Bressane were confirmed as the station's announcers/DJs. In this phase the future Radio Disney begins to disclose telephone for contact, provisional site and realizes a promotion in which takes listeners for the show of the Jonas Brothers in Brazil, where also the arrival of the transmitter is announced. In August 2011, the station's audience began being monitored by Crowley Broadcast Analysis.

Official launch 
On November 7, 2010, the name and date of the launch of the new radio station - Radio Disney and November 29 respectively, is officially released, marking the end of the mystery that almost lasted one year. The launch took place at 7am that day, with the first announcer on air being Telma Emerick. On this day, several Brazilian artists went on air wishing luck for the station.

Programmes/Segments

See also 

Disney Channel Brazil
Radio Disney

External links 

Official Rádio Disney Brasil website

Brazil
Mass media in São Paulo
Radio Disney
Radio Disney
Brazil